Charles Johns may refer to:

Charles Alexander Johns (1811–1874), British botanist and educator
Charles A. Johns (1857–1932), American lawyer, jurist and politician
Charles Johns (golfer) (1887–1947), English golfer